Giannis Loukinas (born 20 September 1991) is a Greek professional footballer who plays as a striker for Super League 2 club Kallithea.

He played football at youth level for Agia Paraskevi and Olympiacos. Loukinas started his professional career with Agia Paraskevi. He has also played for Panionios, Kalloni, PAO Rouf, Niki Volou, Fokikos, Chania and Platanias. Loukinas has been capped with Greece U-19.

Club career

Loukinas started his football in Agia Paraskevi youth team. After scoring twice against Olympiacos in friendly matches he was signed on loan by Olympiacos and moved to the club's U20 squad. After a year in Olympiacos youth squads he returned to Agia Paraskevi where he broke through the first team in the 2008–09 season appearing in 29 matches and scoring 6 goals.

His good performances earned him a transfer and a three-year contract to Greek Superleague club Panionios. Loukinas made his first team debut in a home defeat against Larissa. He played in one more match before he was loaned out to Kalloni and PAO Rouf.

In the 2011–12 season he was indispensable for Niki Volou appearing in all but 4 matches and scoring 3 goals in the club's quest to promotion.

He played for Fokikos in the 2012–13 season appearing in no less than 24 occasions and scored 3 goals before, in May, inguinal hernia let him out for the rest of the season.

On 3 August 2013 Loukinas signed for Chania. He debuted for his new club in the opening match of the season a 2–1 defeat from Iraklis Psachna. His first goal for Chania was an injury time winner against Acharnaikos on 24 November 2013. Throughout the season he played in 34 matches for Chania and scored 9 goals.

On 11 July 2014 he signed a three-year contract with Greek Football League outfit Iraklis. Loukinas debuted for his new club in the opening match of the season, a cup match against Lamia. He scored twice in his league debut for Iraklis, helping the club achieve an away win against Tyrnavos. On May 20, 2015 he scored the winner against AEL which helped Iraklis come back to Superleague.

On 9 September 2015, the 24-year-old forward agreed to three-years' extension with increased earnings. Loukinas will sign his new contract with the club on 12 September. On 2 October 2017 Loukinas signed for Football League club Kairaskakis. On 16 May 2018 he returned to Superleague for the new season, as he signed a two years' contract with PAS Giannina for an undisclosed fee.
On 1 November 2018, he scored four goals in a hammering 5-0 Greek Cup home game against Thyella Kamari.

On 5 February 2019, after being released from PAS Giannina, Loukinas signed a contract with Platanias, until the summer of 2021. Twelve days later, he scored his first goal for the club in a 2-0 home win against Karaiskakis. On 10 March 2019, he scored a late first-half winner in a 1-0 home win against Ergotelis. On 27 March 2018, the Greek striker scored his first career hat-trick, in an astounding 7-0 home win against Sparti. Three days later, he added another 2 in his tally in a 4-0 away win against Irodotos. On 13 April 2019, he scored in an emphatic 5-0 away win against Aiginiakos and four days later he added another one in his tally, in a 4-3 home win against Panachaiki.

On 27th of July 2021, Loukinas signed a two year contract deal with Kalamata.

International career
Loukinas has made his debut for Greece U-19 on 25 May 2009 in a home defeat against Portugal U-19. He made one more appearance three days later on a match against Denmark U-19.

Style of play
Loukinas is a striker with good pace and off the ball movement. He also possesses good dribbling skills but he has low composure and a weak left foot.

Personal life
Zlatan Ibrahimović is Loukinas' idol and Manchester United is his favourite club abroad.

References

External links
myplayer.gr profile

1991 births
Living people
Fokikos A.C. players
Iraklis Thessaloniki F.C. players
Niki Volos F.C. players
Panionios F.C. players
PAS Giannina F.C. players
Platanias F.C. players
Veria NFC players
Kalamata F.C. players
Super League Greece players
Super League Greece 2 players
Greece youth international footballers
Association football forwards
Footballers from Athens
Greek footballers
Olympiacos F.C. players